Crocker National Bank was a United States bank headquartered in San Francisco, California. It was acquired by and merged into Wells Fargo Bank in 1986.

History
The bank traces its history to the Woolworth National Bank in San Francisco.  Charles Crocker, who was one of The Big Four of the Central Pacific Railroad and who constructed America's First transcontinental railroad, acquired a controlling interest in Woolworth for his son William Henry Crocker. The bank was renamed Crocker Woolworth National Bank, later Crocker National Bank.

Crocker National merged with the First National Bank of San Francisco, founded by James D. Phelan, in 1925 to form Crocker First National Bank.

In 1956, Crocker First National Bank merged with the Anglo California National Bank (established by Herbert Fleishhacker) to form Crocker-Anglo Bank. In 1963, Crocker-Anglo Bank later merged with Los Angeles' Citizens National Bank, to become Crocker-Citizens Bank. and later, Crocker Bank.

In the 1970s and early 1980s, Crocker cultivated a reputation for customer service and convenience, including expanded hours. As a part of its promotional campaign, the bank gave "Crocker" Spaniel plush toys to parents who opened an account in the early 1980s. It was also one of the first California banks to offer automated teller machine service. One early television commercial showed a young businessman confidently using the machine, while speaking to it as if it were a person. He was followed by an elderly woman approaching it for the first time, and greeting it with a very uncertain "Hello."

Crocker National Bank was purchased by the British financial institution Midland Bank in 1981, but after a series of financial losses, it was sold to Wells Fargo Bank in 1986. Crocker's executive vice president and two-thirds of the top 70 executives lost their jobs because of the merger.

Other history
On April 21, 1975, a Carmichael, California branch of the bank in the Sacramento area was robbed by several members of the Symbionese Liberation Army. SLA member Emily Harris accidentally fired her shotgun (as she later said in a plea deal) and killed Myrna Opsahl, a 42-year-old customer and mother of four.

In popular culture
Scott Adams worked at Crocker during his first years in the business world. He drew on this and other business experience when creating the Dilbert comic strip.

References

External links
 1970 famous wedding commercial featuring the song "We've Only Just Begun"
Nightclub opens in a former Crocker branch:  Crocker Club
 LA Times report on Crocker Bank history
 Picture of the ornate lobby at Crocker Bank, Montgomery and Post Streets, San Francisco

Wells Fargo legacy banks
Defunct banks of the United States
Defunct financial services companies of the United States
Banks established in 1963
1963 establishments in California
Companies based in San Francisco
Financial District, San Francisco
Banks disestablished in 1986
1986 disestablishments in California
American companies established in 1963
Crocker family